was a village located in Tomata District, Okayama Prefecture, Japan.

As of 2003 (before the merger), the village had an estimated population of 817 and a density of 10.73 persons per km². The total area was 76.13 km².

On March 1, 2005, Tomi, along with the town of Okutsu, and the village of Kamisaibara (all from Tomata District), was merged into the expanded town of Kagamino.

Dissolved municipalities of Okayama Prefecture